The year 1996 is the 4th year in the history of the Ultimate Fighting Championship (UFC), a mixed martial arts promotion based in the United States. In 1996 the UFC held 5 events beginning with, UFC 8: David vs. Goliath.

Title fights

Debut UFC fighters

The following fighters fought their first UFC fight in 1996:

Amaury Bitetti
Brian Johnston
Dave Berry
Dieusel Berto
Don Frye
Fabio Gurgel
Gary Goodridge
Jack Nilson
Jerry Bohlander
Joe Moreira

John Campetella
Julian Sanchez
Keith Mielke
Koji Kitao
Mark Coleman
Mark Schultz
Matt Andersen
Moti Horenstein
Paul Herrera
Rafael Carino

Reza Nasri
Roberto Traven
Sam Adkins
Sam Fulton
Scott Ferrozzo
Scott Fiedler
Steve Nelmark
Tai Bowden
Thomas Ramirez

Events list

See also
 UFC
 List of UFC champions
 List of UFC events

References

Ultimate Fighting Championship by year
1996 in mixed martial arts